The 1988 ABN World Tennis Tournament was a men's tennis tournament played on indoor carpet courts at Rotterdam Ahoy in the Netherlands. It was part of the 1988 Nabisco Grand Prix. It was the 16th edition of the tournament and was held from 8 February through 14 February 1988. First-seeded Stefan Edberg successfully defended his 1987 singles title.

Finals

Singles

 Stefan Edberg defeated  Miloslav Mečíř 7–6, 6–2
 It was Edberg's 1st title of the year and the 17th of his career.

Doubles

 Patrik Kühnen /  Tore Meinecke defeated  Magnus Gustafsson /  Diego Nargiso 7–6, 7–6
 It was Kuhnen's first title of the year and the second of his career. For Meinecke it was also the first title of the year and the second of his career.

References

External links
 Official website 
 Official website 
 ATP tournament profile
 ITF tournament details

 
ABN World Tennis Tournament
ABN World Tennis Tournament
ABN World Tennis Tournament